Events in the year 1897 in Portugal.

Incumbents
Monarch: Carlos I 
President of the Council of Ministers: Ernesto Hintze Ribeiro (until 7 February), José Luciano de Castro (from 7 February)

Events
2 May - Legislative election

Births
2 February - Fernando Jesus, footballer 
17 June - António Fragoso, composer, pianist (died 1918)
Tony D'Algy, actor (died 1977)

Deaths
14 September - José Alberto de Oliveira Anchieta, explorer, naturalist (born 1832)

References

 
Portugal
Years of the 19th century in Portugal
Portugal